The Ministry of Justice of Kazakhstan is government ministry tasked with the duty of overseeing the country's legal agencies.

Organization 
The ministry consists of the following departments:

 Nur-Sultan City Justice Department 
 Almaty City Justice Department 
 Akmola Regional Justice Department 
 Aktobe Regional Justice Department 
 Almaty Regional Justice Department 
 Atyrau Regional Justice Department 
 West Kazakhstan Regional Justice Department
 Jambyl Region Regional Justice Department 
 Karaganda Regional Justice Department
 Karaganda City Justice Department
 Kostanay Regional Justice Department
 Kyzylorda Regional Justice Department
 Mangystau Regional Justice Department
 South Kazakhstan Regional Justice Department
 Mangystau Regional Justice Department
 Pavlodar Regional Justice Department
 North Kazakhstan Regional Justice Department
 East Kazakhstan Regional Justice Department

National governmental bodies:

 Strategic Planning Department
 Department of legislation
 Department of registration of legal acts
 Department of State Property Rights Protection
 Department of International Law and Cooperation
 Department of Expertise of International Economic Integration Projects
 Department of registration service and organization of legal services
 Department of Intellectual Property Rights
 Department for the execution of judicial acts
 Department of Economics and Finance
 Department of Public Service Monitoring and Internal Administration
 Human Resources Department
 Internal Audit Office
 Management of the organization of work to protect state secrets
 Information Management
 Information Security Management

Subordinate organizations of the ministry:

 Center for legal expertise 
 Legislation Institute of the Republic of Kazakhstan
 Center for Legal Information
 National Institute of Intellectual Property

List of ministers 
The following is a list of ministers who have held the office since 1943:

 Myrkazadyr Nurbayev (1943-1952)
 Kylyshbay Sultanov (1952-1960) 
 Bekaydar Dzhussupov (1970-1984)
 Dolda Dospolov (1984-1990)
 Galikhan Yerzhanov (1990-1993)
 Nagashbay Shaykenov (1993-1995)
 Konstantin Kolpakov (1995-1997)
 Bayurzhan Mukhamedzhanov (1997-2000) 
 Igor Rogov (2000-2002)
 Georgy Kim (2002-2003)
 Onalsyn Zhumabekov (2003-2005)
 Zagipa Baliyeva (2005-2009) (1st female to hold that office)
 Rashid Tusupbekov (2009-2012)
 Berik Imashev (2012-2016)
 Marat Beketaev (2016-2022)
 Kanat Musin (2022-2023)
 Azamat Eskaraev (2023-present)

See also 

 Justice ministry
 Politics of Kazakhstan

References 

Justice ministries
Government of Kazakhstan